The 2004–05 Bangladeshi cricket season featured the inaugural Test series in Bangladesh between Bangladesh and New Zealand.  The season also featured tours by India and Zimbabwe. The Bangladesh teams claimed their first test series victory in this season against Zimbabwe.

International tours

New Zealand Cricket team in Bangladesh

New Zealand played 2 Test matches and 3 one day internationals (ODI) against Bangladesh in October 2004. New Zealand won both the Test matches and won all three ODIs.

Indian Cricket team in Bangladesh

India played 2 Test matches and 3 one day internationals (ODI) against Bangladesh in December 2004. India won both the Test matches and won all ODI series 2–1.

Zimbabwe Cricket team in Bangladesh

Zimbabwe played 2 Test matches and 5 one day internationals (ODI) against Bangladesh in January 2005. Bangladesh won both the Test series 1–0 and also won all ODI series 3–2.

Domestic competitions

Honours

National Cricket League

References

2004 in Bangladeshi cricket
2005 in Bangladeshi cricket
Bangladeshi cricket seasons from 2000–01
Domestic cricket competitions in 2004–05